Ambler Airport  is a state-owned public-use airport located one nautical mile (1.85 km) north of the central business district of Ambler, a city in the Northwest Arctic Borough of the U.S. state of Alaska.

As per Federal Aviation Administration records, the airport had 2,357 passenger boardings (enplanements) in calendar year 2008, an increase of 0.13% from the 2,354 enplanements in 2007. This airport is included in the FAA's National Plan of Integrated Airport Systems for 2009–2013, which categorizes it as a general aviation facility.

Although most U.S. airports use the same three-letter location identifier for the FAA and IATA, this airport is assigned AFM by the FAA and ABL by the IATA. The airport's ICAO identifier is PAFM.

Facilities 
It has two runways with gravel surfaces: 9/27 measures 2,400 by 60 feet (732 x 18 m) and 18/36 is 3,000 by 60 feet (914 x 18 m).

Airlines and destinations 

Prior to its bankruptcy and cessation of all operations, Ravn Alaska served the airport from multiple locations.

Statistics

References

External links
 FAA Alaska airport diagram (GIF)
 

Airports in Northwest Arctic Borough, Alaska
Airports in the Arctic